Podstolice may refer to the following places:
Podstolice, Chodzież County in Greater Poland Voivodeship (west-central Poland)
Podstolice, Lesser Poland Voivodeship (south Poland)
Podstolice, Masovian Voivodeship (east-central Poland)
Podstolice, Września County in Greater Poland Voivodeship (west-central Poland)